Presumed Innocent, published in August 1987, is Scott Turow's first novel. It is about a prosecutor charged with the murder of his colleague, an attractive and intelligent prosecutor named Carolyn Polhemus. It is told in the first person by the accused, Rožat "Rusty" Sabich.  A motion picture adaptation starring Harrison Ford was released in 1990.

Plot 
The novel begins with the discovery of the body of Carolyn Polhemus, an assistant prosecuting attorney in fictional Kindle County. She is the victim of what appears to be a sexual bondage encounter gone wrong, killed by a single blow to the skull with an unknown object while tied up. 

Rožat "Rusty" Sabich, a Kindle County prosecutor and co-worker of Carolyn, is assigned her case by his boss, district attorney Raymond Horgan. Horgan is currently losing his re-election campaign against Nico Della Guardia, an old protege turned rival, and informs Rusty that his continued employment is entwined with Horgan's victory, which he believes hinges on finding and convicting Carolyn's killer. This is further complicated by the fact that, unknown to everyone else, Rusty had a brief affair with Carolyn that ended months before her murder. She dumped him when he showed little interest in taking Horgan's job for himself, causing him to realize her ambitious, conniving nature.

Despite his obvious conflict of interest, Rusty takes charge of the investigation, but makes clumsy attempts to divert its areas of inquiry away from the DA's office, and by extension himself. He's assisted by his friend Det. Dan "Lip" Lipranzer, whom Rusty replaces the originally assigned officer with. During the investigation, Rusty learns Horgan also had a brief relationship with Carolyn. The only person who knows of Rusty's own affair is his wife, Barbara, and the subsequent strain on their marriage led him to seek psychiatric help. Throughout the novel he discusses various relationships in his life: with his late father, a closed-off, angry man; with Della Guardia, a friendship that soured due to uncontrollable circumstances; with Barbara, a volatile mixture of devotion and disdain; and of course with Carolyn, which he has struggled to define since its end.

Horgan loses the election and, within days of Della Guardia taking office, he charges Rusty with Carolyn's murder, encouraged by his overzealous deputy, Tommy Molto. Rusty hires Alejandro "Sandy" Stern, an Argentinean defense lawyer who has been a frequent opponent over the years, to represent him. The judge assigned to the case is Larren Lyttle, an old friend and colleague of Horgan's who has an acrimonious history with Molto.

The prosecution's case against Rusty, which failed to definitively prove his affair and thus lacks motive, relies on circumstantial evidence: a bar glass with his fingerprints, sperm that might be his in Carolyn's vagina, carpet fabric that might be from his home, and records of a call from his home to Carolyn's apartment on the night of the murder, along with his attempts to seemingly impede the investigation. However, just as the trial begins the prosecution is forced to admit the glass is missing; Larren refuses to delay until it is located. As the trial ensues, Rusty learns through his and Lipranzer's independent investigations that Lyttle also had an affair with Polhemus, and that she acted as a courier in a bribery scheme where Lyttle was paid by defendants to let them off in court. Stern, while subtly threatening Lyttle with his own knowledge of this, is able to discredit a forensic expert's testimony regarding the sperm sample and inconclusive witness statements, persuasively arguing that Molto, who was aware of the bribery scheme but not involved, has fabricated evidence to frame Rusty out of misguided loyalty to Carolyn. Without proof of the affair or that Rusty had been in Carolyn's apartment the night of the murder, Larren sees no reason to continue and dismisses the case.

Time passes and Rusty's relationship with Barbara worsens, after the trial had seemingly repaired it. When she announces her intention to leave him and take their son, Rusty explains his deduction that she killed Carolyn, as revenge on the woman who nearly destroyed her family; she admits that he is correct. During a visit to Rusty's house, Lipranzer reveals that he has the missing bar glass, which came about due to careless mismanagement by Molto and Lip's own disinterest in aiding the prosecution. Rusty talks Lip through how and why Barbara committed the murder while thoroughly cleaning the glass, destroying the only real evidence against him. They speculate whether Barbara left the glass at the scene because she wanted Rusty to know what she had done, or because she wanted him to be convicted. Rusty ultimately decides it doesn't matter, as he cannot bring himself to deprive his son of a mother and, except for Lip, will never admit the truth to anyone.

Della Guardia, his reputation destroyed by the trial, loses a recall election and Rusty is appointed to finish out his term, although his professional prospects beyond that are uncertain. The novel ends as Rusty reflects on Carolyn's murder, which remains officially unsolved nearly a year later. He wonders what led him into the affair which ultimately caused everything to happen, and concludes that it was an attempt to escape the existential crisis that has plagued him most of his adult life, even if what she offered him was never more than a fantasy.

Setting and sequel
Many of the minor characters in Presumed Innocent also appear in Turow's later novels, which are all set in the fictional, Midwestern Kindle County. A sequel to Presumed Innocent, entitled Innocent, was released on May 4, 2010, and continues the relationship between Rusty Sabich and Tommy Molto.

Reception
Scott Martelle of Los Angeles Times called the novel's plot twists "inventive". Kevin J. Hamilton of The Seattle Times called its story "clever, chilling and wildly unpredictable."

Adaptation
Before the original novel was released in August 1987, director Sydney Pollack bought the film rights for $1 million. The film adaptation was eventually released in 1990, directed by Alan J. Pakula and starring Harrison Ford as Rusty.

References

External links
 Scott Turow discusses Presumed Innocent on the BBC World Book Club

Kindle County
1987 American novels
Adultery in novels
Novels by Scott Turow
Legal thriller novels
American novels adapted into films
Farrar, Straus and Giroux books
Novels set in Illinois
1987 debut novels